Troels Lund Poulsen (born 30 March 1976 in Vejle) is a Danish politician, who is Minister for Economic Affairs and a member of the Folketing for the Venstre political party. He served as Minister for the Environment from 2007 to 2010, Minister for Taxation from 2010 to 2011, Minister of Education in 2011, Minister for Commerce, Business and Growth from 2015 to 2016 and Minister for Employment from 2016 to 2019.

Political career
Poulsen as first elected into parliament at the 2001 Danish general election.

In late 2011, he became the center of a dispute regarding the disclosure of confidential documents in favor of discrediting the former Danish prime minister, Helle Thorning-Schmidt and her husband Stephen Kinnock due to their tax relations.
The affair happened in the 2011 Danish parliamentary election and involved the head of SKAT (The Danish tax agency) Copenhagen (Erling Andersen), the Permanent Secretary of State in the Ministry of Taxes (Peter Loft) and the spindoctor of Troels Lund Poulsen (Peter Arnfeldt).

Bibliography
Atlantiske afstande (2004, co-author)
Den forandrede verden (2003, co-author)
Tid til forandring (2001)

References

External links

 

1976 births
Living people
People from Vejle Municipality
Danish writers
Government ministers of Denmark
Danish Ministers for the Environment
Education ministers of Denmark
Danish Tax Ministers
Venstre (Denmark) politicians
Members of the Folketing 2001–2005
Members of the Folketing 2005–2007
Members of the Folketing 2007–2011
Members of the Folketing 2011–2015
Members of the Folketing 2015–2019
Members of the Folketing 2019–2022
Employment ministers of Denmark
Members of the Folketing 2022–2026